Dewar benzene (also spelled dewarbenzene) or bicyclo[2.2.0]hexa-2,5-diene is a bicyclic isomer of benzene with the molecular formula C6H6. The compound is named after James Dewar who included this structure in a list of possible C6H6 structures in 1869.  However, he did not propose it as the structure of benzene, and in fact he supported the correct structure previously proposed by August Kekulé in 1865.

Structure and properties
Unlike benzene, Dewar benzene is not flat because the carbons where the rings join are bonded to four atoms rather than three. These carbons tend toward tetrahedral geometry, and the two cyclobutene rings make an angle where they are cis-fused to each other. The compound has nevertheless considerable strain energy and reverts to benzene with a chemical half-life of two days. This thermal conversion is relatively slow because it is symmetry forbidden based on orbital symmetry arguments.

Synthesis
The compound itself was first synthesized in 1962 as a tert-butyl derivative and then as the unsubstituted compound by Eugene van Tamelen in 1963 by photolysis of the cis-1,2-dihydro derivative of phthalic anhydride followed by oxidation with lead tetraacetate.

"Dewar benzene" and benzene

It is sometimes incorrectly claimed that Dewar proposed his structure as the true structure of benzene. In fact, Dewar merely wrote the structure as one of seven possible isomers and believed that his experiments on benzene supported the (correct) structure that had been proposed by Kekulé.

After the development of valence bond theory in 1928, benzene was described primarily using its two major resonance contributors, the two Kekulé structures.  The three possible Dewar structures were considered as minor resonance contributors in the overall description of benzene, alongside other classic structures such as the isomers prismane, benzvalene and Claus' benzene. Prismane and benzvalene were synthesized in the 1970s; Claus' benzene is impossible to synthesize.

Hexamethyl Dewar benzene
Hexamethyl Dewar benzene has been prepared by bicyclotrimerization of dimethylacetylene with aluminium chloride.  It undergoes a rearrangement reaction with hydrohalic acids to which the appropriate salt can be added to form the organometallic pentamethylcyclopentadienyl rhodium dichloride and pentamethylcyclopentadienyl iridium dichloride dimers; consequently, it can be used as a starting material for synthesising some pentamethylcyclopentadienyl organometallic compounds including [Cp*Rh(CO)2].  Attempting a similar reaction with potassium tetrachloroplatinate results in the formation of a pentamethylcyclopentadiene complex, [(η4-Cp*H)PtCl2], indicating that the rhodium and iridium metal centres are necessary for the step in which the aromatic anion is formed.

One of the alkenes can be epoxidized using mCPBA, peroxybenzoic acid, or dimethyldioxirane (DMDO). Using a peracid (mCPBA or peroxybenzoic acid), the epoxy product quickly rearranges, catalyzed by the acid byproduct of the epoxidation.

Using DMDO gives the epoxide as a stable product—the byproduct of the epoxidation is neutral acetone. By varying the amount of DMDO, either the mono- or diepoxide can be formed, with the oxygen atoms exo on the bicyclic carbon framework.

In 1973, the dication of hexamethylbenzene, was produced by Hepke Hogeveen and Peter Kwant. This can be done by dissolving the hexamethyl Dewar benzene monoepoxide in magic acid, which removes the oxygen as an anion. NMR had previously hinted at a pentagonal pyramidal structure in a related cation as had spectral data on the Hogeveen and Kwant dication.  The pyramidal structure having an apex carbon bonding to six other carbon atoms was confirmed by X-ray crystallographic analysis of the hexafluoroantimonate salt published in 2016.

Computational organic chemist Steven Bachrach discussed the dication, noting that the weak bonds forming the upright edges of the pyramid, shown as dashed lines in the structure he drew, have a Wiberg bond order of about 0.54; it follows that the total bond order for the apical carbon is 5 × 0.54 + 1 = 3.7 < 4, and thus the species is not hypervalent, but it is hypercoordinate.  From the perspective of organometallic chemistry, the species can be viewed as having a carbon(IV) centre bound to an aromatic  anion (six-electron donor) and a methyl anion (two-electron donor), thereby satisfying the octet rule and being analogous to the gas-phase organozinc monomer  which has the same ligands bound to a zinc(II) centre and satisfies the 18 electron rule on the metal.  Thus, while unprecedented, and having attracted comment in  Chemical & Engineering News, New Scientist, Science News, and ZME Science, the structure is consistent with the usual bonding rules of chemistry.  Moritz Malischewski, who carried out the work with Konrad Seppelt, commented that one the motivations for undertaking the work was to illustrate "the possibility to astonish chemists about what can be possible."

References

Hydrocarbons
Cyclobutenes
Substances discovered in the 1960s